John Claude Campbell Hamilton (born 17 February 1854) was a Canadian politician. He served on the 1st Council of the Northwest Territories for Broadview from 1883 to 1885.

Hamilton was born in Edinburgh, Scotland. After receiving education at Merchiston Castle School, and in Godesberg, Germany, he later lived in Sundrum, Ayr, Scotland. He was a justice of the peace and farmer in County Ayr. Hamilton was also a lieutenant in the Ayrshire Yeomanry.

He was elected in 1883 to the Council of the North West Territories, and retired at the next election, in 1885.

Electoral results

1883 election

References

1854 births
Year of death missing
People educated at Merchiston Castle School
Ayrshire (Earl of Carrick's Own) Yeomanry officers
Members of the Legislative Assembly of the Northwest Territories